Keiron: The First Voyager is a 1995 Australian film about escapees from the planet earth. It was shot from February to March 1985.

References

External links
Keiron: The First Voyager at IMDb

Australian action adventure films
1990s English-language films
Films directed by Bert Deling
1990s Australian films